The Lavochkin La-9 (NATO reporting name Fritz) was a Soviet fighter aircraft produced shortly after World War II. It was one of the last piston engined fighters to be produced before the widespread adoption of the jet engine.

Development
La-9 represents a further development of the Lavochkin La-126 prototype. The first prototype, designated La-130 was finished in 1946. Similarity to the famous Lavochkin La-7 was only superficial – the new fighter had an all-metal construction and a laminar flow wing. Weight savings due to elimination of wood from the airframe allowed for greatly improved fuel capacity and four-cannon armament. Mock combat demonstrated that the La-130 was evenly matched with the La-7 but was inferior to the Yakovlev Yak-3 in horizontal planes. The new fighter, officially designated La-9, entered production in August 1946. A total of 1,559 aircraft were built by the end of production in 1948.

Variants
Like other aircraft designers at the time, Lavochkin was experimenting with using jet propulsion to augment performance of piston-engined fighters. One such attempt was La-130R with an RD-1Kh3 liquid fuel rocket engine in addition to the Shvetsov ASh-82FN piston powerplant. The project was cancelled in 1946 before the prototype could be assembled. A more unusual approach was La-9RD which was tested in 1947–1948. It was a production La-9 with a reinforced airframe and armament reduced to two cannons, which carried a single RD-13 pulsejet (the engine which powered the V-1 flying bomb, probably taken from surplus Luftwaffe stocks) under each wing. The 70 km/h (45 mph) increase in top speed came at the expense of tremendous noise and vibration. The engines were unreliable and worsened the handling. The project was abandoned although between 3 and 9 La-9RD were reported to perform at airshows, no doubt pleasing the crowds with the noise.

Other notable La-9 variants were:
 La-9UTI – two-seat trainer version. Built at GAZ-99 in Ulan-Ude. Two versions exist: with 12.7 mm UBS machine gun and with one 23 mm NS-23 cannon (all armament is mounted in the cowling above the engine, firing through the propeller).
 La-132 (La-132) – prototype with upgraded Shvetsov M-93 engine. Projected top speed 740 km/h (460 mph) at 6,500 m (21,325 ft). Engine proved a failure and the single prototype was equipped with an experimental Shvetsov ASh-82M instead. The aircraft did not proceed to production.
 La-9M (La-134) – long-range fighter prototype, see Lavochkin La-11
 La-9RD – one La-9 was fitted with two auxiliary RD-13 pulsejet engines underwing.
 La-138 – one La-9 was fitted with two underwing PVRD-450 auxiliary ramjet engines.

Operators
People's Republic of China
 People's Liberation Army Air Force Imported 129 La-9 airplanes in 1950. The last 5 La-9 fighters retired in 1959.
East Germany
 Volkspolizei (5 operated from 1952 to 1956 prior to the formation of the Air Forces of the National People's Army)
North Korea
 North Korea Air Force
Romania
 Romanian Air Force (10 delivered in 1950: 5 La-9 and 5 La-9 UTI)
Soviet Union
 Soviet Air Force
 Soviet Air Defence Forces

Surviving aircraft

China
La-9 6201 is on display at Beijing Aeronautical Institute, Beijing, China as 7504
La-9 (unidentified S/N) on display at People's Liberation Army Air Force Museum, Datangshan, Chiangping, China as 06
La-9UTI (unidentified S/N) on display at People's Liberation Army Air Force Museum, Datangshan, Chiangping, China

North Korea
La-9 102 is on display at Glorious Fatherland Liberation War Museum, Pyongyang, North Korea

Romania
La-9 66 on display at Central Military Museum, Bucharest, Romania

United States
La-9 28 owned by Jerry Yagen's Military Aviation Museum and restored by Pioneer Aero Restorations in New Zealand between 2001 and 2003, airworthy as N415ML

Specifications (La-9)

See also

References

Further reading

 Gordon, Yefim. Lavochkin's Piston-Engined Fighters (Red Star Volume 10). Earl Shilton, Leicester, UK: Midland Publishing Ltd., 2003. .
 Green, William. War Planes of the Second World War, Volume Three: Fighters. London: Macdonald & Co.(Publishers) Ltd., 1961. .
 Kopenhagen, W (ed.), Das große Flugzeug-Typenbuch (in German). Transpress, 1987, .

La-009
Low-wing aircraft
1940s Soviet fighter aircraft
Single-engined tractor aircraft
Aircraft first flown in 1946
Retractable conventional landing gear